Meireles is a Portuguese-language surname and may refer to :

Footballers
 Clayton Nascimento Meireles (born 1989), Brazilian footballer, plays for Avaí Futebol Clube
 Flávio Meireles (born 1976), a Portuguese football defensive midfielder
 Hendrich Miller Meireles Bernardo (born 1986), a Brazilian attacking midfielder
 Raul Meireles (born 1983), a Portuguese football midfielder

Other
 Cecília Meireles (1901-1964), a Brazilian poet
 Cildo Meireles (born 1948), a Brazilian conceptual artist
 Helena Meireles (1924–2005), a Brazilian guitar player and composer
 Isa Meireles (?-2008), a Portuguese journalist, reporter and writer
 Manuel Quintão Meireles (1880-1957), a Portuguese Navy officer and politician

See also
 Meirelles (archaic spelling)

Portuguese-language surnames